Peter Jansen Wessel Tordenskiold (28 October 1690 – 12 November 1720), commonly referred to as Tordenskjold, was a Norwegian nobleman and flag officer who spent his career in the service of the Royal Dano-Norwegian Navy. He rose to the rank of vice-admiral for his services in the Great Northern War. Born in the Norwegian city of Trondheim, Peter Wessel travelled to Copenhagen in 1704, and eventually enlisted in the navy.

He won a name for himself through audacity and courage, and was ennobled as Peter Tordenskiold by King Frederick IV in 1716. His greatest exploit came later that year, as he destroyed the supply fleet of Charles XII of Sweden at the Battle of Dynekilen, ensuring his siege of Fredriksten would end in failure. In 1720, he was killed in a duel. In both Denmark and Norway he ranks among the most famous naval captains. He experienced an unusually rapid rise in rank and died when he was only 30 years old.

Name
His birth name was Peter Jansen Wessel. His name occurs with spellings as Peder and Pitter. Upon his ennoblement in 1716, he received the name Tordenskiold meaning "Thunder Shield". This was also the orthographical form which he used. In newer times, the form Tordenskjold has become usual.

Biography
Born in Trondheim in Norway, he was the tenth child of alderman Jan Wessel, and the brother of later Rear-Admiral . Peter Wessel was a wild, unruly lad who gave his pious parents much trouble, eventually stowing away on a ship heading for Copenhagen in 1704. In Copenhagen, he unsuccessfully sought to become a navy cadet. He befriended the king's chaplain Peder Jespersen, who sent Wessel on a voyage to the West Indies, and finally procured a vacant cadetship for him. After further voyages, this time to the East Indies, Wessel was appointed second lieutenant in the Royal Danish-Norwegian Navy on 7 July 1711, and went on to serve on the frigate Postillion. While on Postillion, he befriended Norwegian admiral baron Waldemar Løvendal, who was the first to recognize the young man's potential as a naval officer. Løvendal soon made Peter Wessel the captain of the four-gun sloop Ormen.

Early service time
Wessel started his navy service during the Great Northern War against Sweden, cruising about the Swedish coast in Ormen picking up useful information about the enemy. In June 1712, Løvendal promoted him to the 18-gun frigate Løvendals Galej, against the advice of the Danish admiralty, who considered Wessel unreliable. After officially complaining about his dreary commanding officer Daniel Jacob Wilster in Norway, Wessel was transferred to the Baltic Sea command of Ulrik Christian Gyldenløve, who appreciated and utilized Wessel's courage. Wessel was already renowned for two things: the audacity with which he attacked any Swedish vessels he came across regardless of the odds, and his unique seamanship, which always enabled him to evade capture.

The Great Northern War had now entered upon its later stage, when Sweden, beset on every side by foes, employed her fleet principally to transport troops and stores to the distressed Swedish Pomerania provinces. The audacity of Wessel impeded her at every point. He was continually snapping up transports, dashing into the fjords where her vessels lay concealed, and holding up her detached frigates. He was a part of Gyldenløve's fleet which succeeded in destroying a large number of Swedish transport ships at Rügen on 29 September 1712, and was promoted from second lieutenant to captain lieutenant. His successes compelled the Swedes to post a reward for his capture, while his free and easy ways also won him enemies in the Danish navy, who deplored his almost privateer-like conduct.

Court-martial

In 1714, Wessel was court-martialled after an indecisive sea battle with a Swedish frigate. The account of the incident is verified by the legal proceedings from November 1714. On 26 July 1714, he encountered a frigate under British flag near Lindesnes, while flying a Dutch flag on the Løvendals Gallej himself. The other frigate was De Olbing Galley carrying 28 guns, which had been equipped in Great Britain for the Swedes and was on its way to Gothenburg under the command of a British captain named Bactmann. De Olbing Galley signalled for Løvendals Gallej to come closer, and as Wessel raised the Danish flag, Bactmann fired a broadside at him. In the British captain, Wessel met a tough match. The combat lasted all day, and when De Olbing Galley tried to escape in the evening, Wessel set more sails and continued the duel. The fight was interrupted by nightfall, and renewed again indecisively the following morning. Both ships were badly damaged after around 14 hours of fighting, when Wessel was running out of ammunition. He then sent an envoy to the British ship, cordially thanking the British for a good duel, and asked if he could borrow some of their ammunition in order to continue the fight. His request was denied, and the captains drank to each other's health, before the ships dispersed.

When he heard about the incident, king Frederick IV of Denmark asked for the admiralty to court-martial Wessel. He stood trial in November 1714, accused of disclosing vital military information about his lack of ammunition to the enemy, as well as endangering the ship of king Frederick IV by fighting a superior enemy force. The spirit with which he defended himself and the contempt he poured on his less courageous comrades took the fancy of Frederick IV. He successfully argued a section of the Danish naval code which mandated attacking fleeing enemy ships no matter the size, and was acquitted on 15 December 1714. He then went to the king asking for a promotion, and was raised to the rank of captain on 28 December 1714.

Greatest exploits

When, in 1715, the return of King Charles XII of Sweden from Turkey to Stralsund put new life into the dispirited Swedish forces, Wessel distinguished himself in numerous engagements off the coast of Swedish Pomerania, under the command of Admiral Christian Carl Gabel. He did the enemy considerable damage by cutting out their frigates and destroying their transports. During a battle at Kolberg on 24 April 1715, Wessel captured the Swedish Rear-Admiral Hans Wachtmeister, as well as the frigate Vita Örn (White Eagle), which he was granted as his new flagship under the name Hvide Ørn. He then transferred to the main fleet under the command of Peter Raben.

On returning to Denmark in the beginning of 1716 he was ennobled by Frederick IV under the name of Tordenskiold. When in the course of 1716, Charles XII invaded Norway and laid siege to the fortress of Fredrikshald, Tordenskiold compelled him to raise the siege and retire to Sweden. He did so by pouncing upon the Swedish transport fleet, laden with ammunition and other military stores, which rode at anchor in the narrow and dangerous Dynekil Fjord. With two frigates and five smaller ships, he conquered or destroyed around 30 Swedish ships, with little damage to himself during the Battle of Dynekilen on 8 July 1716.

For this his greatest exploit, he was promoted to the rank of post-captain, commanding the Kattegat squadron – but at the same time incurred the enmity of Christian Carl Gabel, whom he had failed to take into his confidence. Tordenskiold's first important command was the squadron with which he was entrusted in the beginning of 1717 for the purpose of destroying the Swedish Gothenburg Squadron, which interrupted the communications between Denmark and Norway. Owing to the disloyalty of certain of his officers who resented serving under the young adventurer, Tordenskjold failed to do all that was expected of him. His enemies were not slow to take advantage of his partial failure. The old charge of criminal recklessness was revived against him at a second court-martial before which he was summoned in 1718, but his old patron Ulrik Christian Gyldenløve intervened energetically on his behalf, and the charge was quashed.

In December 1718, Tordenskiold brought to Frederick IV the welcome news of the death of Charles XII and was in turn made Rear-Admiral. Tordenskiold captured the Swedish fortress of Carlsten at Marstrand in 1719. The last feat of arms during the Great Northern War was Tordenskiold's partial destruction and partial capture of the Gothenburg Squadron which had so long eluded him, on 26 September 1719. He was rewarded with the rank of vice-admiral.

Death by duelling
Tordenskiold did not long survive the termination of the war. On 12 November 1720, at the age of 30, he was killed in a duel by Livonian colonel Jakob Axel Staël von Holstein. During a trip to Hannover, Tordenskiold got in a fight with von Holstein, who had been in Swedish military service. The confrontation ended in a duel on the Sehlwiese in Gleidingen near Hildesheim, in which Tordenskiold was run through by the sword of von Holstein. The circumstances around the death of Tordenskiold were set in a conspiratorial light, as summed up in the contemporary three-volume Tordenskiold biography (1747–1750) by C. P. Rothe.

The duel was encouraged by a dispute with von Holstein, whom Tordenskiold offended by labeling him as a cheat at gambling. At a dinner party, Tordenskiold told of a friend who had been cheated while gambling with a man who claimed to own a Hydra, to which von Holstein announced he was the owner of the said creature and took offence at being called a cheat. This dispute turned into a fight, in which von Holstein unsuccessfully tried to pull a sword, after which Tordenskiold used the pommel of his own sword to beat him up. von Holstein demanded satisfaction through a duel. The details of the duel – besides its ending with Tordenskiold's death by a single wound by von Holstein's sword – are not well known.

Tordenskiold's corpse was brought to Copenhagen to the Holmen Church without much ceremony, as duelling was not allowed according to Danish law of the time. In 1819, he was buried in a sarcophagus.

Legacy

Although – Dynekilen excepted – Tordenskiold's individual victories were of less importance than Christen Thomesen Sehested's at the Siege of Stralsund and Ulrich Christian Gyldenløve's at Rügen, he is seen as the most heroic figure of the Great Northern War, after Charles XII. He is mentioned by name both in the Danish national anthem "Kong Christian stod ved højen mast" from 1778 and the Norwegian national anthem "Ja, vi elsker dette landet" from 1864.

Statues of him have been erected in Copenhagen (1876), Trondheim, Stavern, Oslo and Haakonsvern. In the United States, Tordenskjold Township in the state of Minnesota was settled in 1871 by Danish brothers who named it after him. The coat of arms of Holmestrand included his ship , until the municipal merger in 2020, after which a new coat of arms was introduced.

The Royal Danish Navy has named several ships after him, including an early 20th century coastal defence ship. The Niels Juel class corvette , served from around 1980 to August 2009. The Royal Norwegian Navy has also named ships after him, such as the coastal defence ship Tordenskjold, and the Royal Norwegian Naval Training Establishment in Bergen is named KNM Tordenskjold.

The Danish city of Frederikshavn has hosted an annual summer festival in his memory since 1998. Tordenskiold was stationed there, and wrote 67 letters from there between 1717 and 1719. In 2008 the Festival attracted more than 30,000 visitors. In 2009 the Days of Tordenskiold were celebrated on 26, 27, and 28 June.

In several Danish and Norwegian cities, there are streets named Tordenskjoldsgade (Tordenskjold Street) after him.

The most popular brand of matches in Denmark is called Tordenskjold. In the late 1800s, Sweden had a large export production of matches, so a Danish manufacturer put Tordenskiold's portrait on his matchbox in 1882, in the hope he could once more strike at the Swedish. The Tordenskjold brand was bought by a Swedish company in 1972.

In fiction
Though his victories were not decisive in the course of the war, he eventually attained mythic status, as one of the most successful Dano-Norwegian military commanders. As the Danish-Norwegian Union ended in the 1814 with the Treaty of Kiel and Denmark consigned itself to the status of a minor power following the Napoleonic Wars, Tordenskiold was revived as both a Danish and Norwegian national symbol. He was portrayed as the little guy outsmarting his far more powerful adversaries, and his exploits were enhanced by mixing in myths and fiction.

A comprehensive fictionalized account was collected in the 1858 popular song "Jeg vil sjunge om en Helt", and a great number of fictional plays and novels were subsequently published. These accounts served as background for the 1910 Danish film "Peter Tordenskjold", based on a Carit Etlar play, and the 1942 film "Tordenskjold går i land". In 1993, the two-act musical Tordenskjold opened, a mix of fact and fiction, with Øystein Wiik as Peter Wessel. The musical was performed in Gladsaxe and Aarhus.  The 2016 film "Satisfaction 1720" is another mix of fact, fiction and speculation about Tordenskjold after the Great Northern War and the duel that ended his life.

One of the myths about Tordenskiold has entered into the Danish and Norwegian languages. During the negotiations for Marstrand's surrender in 1719, it is told he had his men move from block to block as he was walking the Marstrand commander through his positions, thus convincing the commander that his strength was much greater than it actually was. This gave birth to the idiom "Tordenskjold's soldiers", denoting the same group of people (feeling compelled to) repeatedly taking charge and fill multiple roles.

See also
 Tordenskiold
 Tordenskiold Oak
 Danish nobility
 Norwegian nobility

References

Further reading

1690 births
1720 deaths
Danish admirals
Danish military personnel of the Great Northern War
Duelling fatalities
Norwegian admirals
People from Trondheim
Royal Dano-Norwegian Navy personnel